Valeri Vladimirovich Umnov (born 11 December 1974) is a Russian professional football coach and a former player.

Club career
He played 4 seasons in the Russian Football National League for FC Volgar-Gazprom Astrakhan and FC Mashuk-KMV Pyatigorsk.

References

1974 births
People from Mineralnye Vody
Sportspeople from Stavropol Krai
Living people
Russian footballers
Association football defenders
FC Dynamo Stavropol players
FC Volgar Astrakhan players
Russian football managers
FC Mashuk-KMV Pyatigorsk players